The following is a list of mayors of Surrey, British Columbia. It includes the mayors of Surrey since 1880.

References

Surrey
List